The Superfund Research Program (SRP) was created within the National Institute of Environmental Health Sciences in 1986 under the Superfund Amendments and Reauthorization Act (SARA). The SRP is a university-based research program that supports the national Superfund program by addressing a wide variety of scientific concerns. 

The SRP has a broad mandate including:

The development of methods and resources to detect hazardous substances in the environment.
The improvement of techniques of assessing the effects of hazardous substances on human health.
The development of methods of assessing the risks hazardous substances pose to human health.
The development of biological, chemical, and physical methods of decreasing hazardous substances and their toxicity.

The SRP currently funds multi-project grants at sixteen institutions (Boston University School of Public Health, Brown University, Columbia University, Dartmouth College, Harvard School of Public Health, Massachusetts Institute of Technology, Michigan State University, Northeastern University, Oregon State University, University of Arizona, University of California, Berkeley, University of California, Davis, University of California, San Diego, University of Iowa, University of Kentucky, University of North Carolina at Chapel Hill, and the University of Washington). The SRP also funds individual research projects (R01s), small business innovation research, and small business technology transfer research. 

The 2008 budget request amount for the SRP was $50.198 million.

See also
TOXMAP
List of Superfund sites in the United States

References

External links
 National Institute of Environmental Health Sciences:Superfund Research Program
 SRP Center at Oregon State University
 University of Washington Superfund Research Program
 Dartmouth College Toxic Metals Superfund Research Program
 Boston University Superfund Research Program
National Institutes of Health
Environmental organizations based in the United States
Research